Kyle Park is a Texas country singer-songwriter and music producer from Leander, Texas.

He self-released his first studio album, Big Time, in 2005, and after his second album in 2008, Anywhere in Texas, he released Spring 2010 EP and Fall 2010 EP, the latter reaching No. 7 on iTunes' Top Ten Country Records. It also hit No. 1 on Billboard Heatseekers South Central list. In 2011 he released the album Make or Break Me. The eponymous single from the album peaked at No. 3 on the Texas Music Chart, and received a number of positive reviews. He released Beggin' for More in 2013.

Biography

Early life
Kyle Park was born in July 1985 in Austin, Texas, and was raised in Leander, a small country town north of Austin, where he attended Leander High School. He listened to country and rock radio in particular, and eventually began focusing on artists such as Clint Black and Chris LeDoux.

Park started playing guitar at age 14, and wrote his first song and first performed live the next year. His music was first played on the radio (KVET 98.1 Austin) when he was 17 years old.

Music career
After high school Park attended Texas State University in San Marcos for two years. While in college he would often sing covers with members of George Strait's band Ace in the Hole at a local music club, and soon formed a band with Karl Schwoch on guitar, Will Armstrong on drums, and Colton James Reininger on bass. He left college to tour with the band.

He released his debut country album Big Time in 2005. In 2006 Park started recording original music at Ray Benson's Bismeaux Studio, where his drummer Armstrong was a recording engineer. A second LP, Anywhere in Texas, followed in 2008. Park also founded Kyle Park Music, Inc., his personal record label.

Around 2009 Park began to record new music, also learning how to produce. He released Spring 2010 EP in 2010, with another album, Fall 2010 EP, released that September. He spent 2010 touring and reached up to 200 shows a year, chiefly in Texas. Fall EP received a number of positive reviews and hit No. 7 on iTunes' Top Ten Country Records Chart, No. 1 on Billboard'''s Heatseekers South Central list, No. 28 on the Top Heatseekers roster, and No. 56 on the Top Country Albums chart. The EP's single "All Night" was the first to receive regular airplay and was in the Top 25 on Texas radio charts for several months. According to a review, "Park’s pure country voice and pure country vibe shine through in his modern country, 'rock with a twang' style."

His LP Make or Break Me was released on September 20, 2011 on Winding Road Music. It included nine remixed tracks from his last two EPs and six new tracks, all produced and written or co-written by Park. By November 16, 2011, the album's main single "Make Or Break Me" hit No. 3 on the Texas Music Chart and sat in the top 10 for over six weeks, and by December 12 was still at No. 7. It also reached the top ten of the Texas Regional Radio Report. He made music videos for the tracks both "Make Or Break Me" and "Leavin' Stephenville." The album was described as a "mixture of up-tempo, guitar-driven honky-tonkers and heartfelt ballads," and was given 3/5 stars by Allmusic. Vintage Guitar Magazine praised the guitar work and songwriting, and Red Dirt Report wrote "His vocals are warm, with a John Denver-like wistfulness to them."

As of 2012 Park plays more than 175 shows a year. He has stated he tries to repeat venues to become familiar with his fanbase. In 2011 the live band added a keyboard player and toured France and Germany for the second time. He has opened for groups such as Clint Black, Tracy Lawrence, Mark Chesnutt, Gary Allan, Jack Ingram, Randy Rogers Band and the Eli Young Band, and regularly tours or works with country rocker Cody Johnson.

Park wrote the theme song for The Sportsman Channel's show Veteran Outdoors. On May 23, 2011 he was featured in the episode "Anywhere in Texas," named after one of Park's albums. The show is a non-profit providing wounded veterans with information about hunting, fishing, and other outdoor activities, and is intended to raise awareness about the therapeutic effects the outdoors can have for recovering troops.

Released in early 2013, his single "The Night is Young" climbed to No. 3 on the Texas Country Charts, later reaching No. 1. He commissioned fans to make the music video. His track "True Love" also climbed various country charts. Both tracks were included on his March 2013 solo album Beggin' for More'', which he produced. The album went to No. 4 on country iTunes on March 21, and was dubbed to have a "fresh sound; traditional country mixed with restless, U2-style guitar sounds and unexpected chord changes." He released 3 more singles after "The Night is Young", " Fit For The King", "  Long Distance Relationship", and "Turn That Crown Upside Down" which all were Top Ten hits on both the Texas Music Chart, and the Texas Regional Radio Report.

Discography

Albums

Singles

Music videos
"Make or Break Me" (2011)
"Leavin' Stephenville" (2012)
"Fit for the King" (2013)
"True Love" (2013)
"Long Distance Relationship" (2013)
"Turn That Crown Upside Down" (2014)
"What Goes Around Comes Around" (2015)
"Come On" (2015)
"Rednecks with Paychecks" (2016)
"Don't Forget Where You Come From" (2017)
"What the Heaven" (2018)
"Ain't Nobody Hotter" (2018)
"Rio" (2019)
"Every Day Kind of Love" (2019)
"What's Your Drinkin' Song" (2022)

References

External links

Kyle Park on MySpace
Kyle Park on Twitter
Kyle Park on Facebook
Kyle Park on YouTube

Living people
1985 births
Writers from Austin, Texas
American country singer-songwriters
American male singer-songwriters
Musicians from Austin, Texas
Singer-songwriters from Texas
People from Leander, Texas
21st-century American singers
Country musicians from Texas
21st-century American male singers